Gilberdyke is a village and civil parish in the East Riding of Yorkshire, England.

The civil parish is formed by the village of Gilberdyke and the hamlets of Bennetland, Hive, Sandholme and Scalby.
According to the 2011 UK Census, Gilberdyke parish had a population of 3,430, an increase on the 2001 UK Census figure of 3,028.

The village is served by Gilberdyke railway station with trains operating between Scarborough/Bridlington via Hull to Doncaster and Sheffield, and between Hull and Selby/York.

The village was recorded as simply 'Dyc' in 1234 and 'Dyke' in 1336; 'Gilberdyke' was first mentioned in 1349 and 'Gilbertdike' in 1376. Who 'Gilbert' refers to is unknown.

In 1823 Gilberdyke was in the parish of Eastrington, the Wapentake of Holderness, and the Liberty of St Peter. Population, including the settlements of Hive and Sandholm[e], was 640. Occupations at the time included four farmers, two blacksmiths, two carpenters, a shoemaker, a corn miller, a constable, a schoolmaster, an overseer, and the licensed victualler of The Cross Keys public house.

Current Asking Alexandria and We Are Harlot vocalist Danny Worsnop grew up here.

References

External links

Villages in the East Riding of Yorkshire
Civil parishes in the East Riding of Yorkshire